Cape Verdeans in Canada are Canadian residents whose ancestry originated in Cape Verde. 

Cape Verdean immigration to Canada began in the late 19th century with just a few people.  

Prior to independence in 1975, Cape Verdean immigrants were registered as Portuguese immigrants from the overseas province of Portuguese Cape Verde. 

The first Cape Verdean immigrants arrived aboard ships which would pick up passengers in Cape Verde.  Cape Verdean immigration grew noticeably in the 1960s as Cape Verde suffered drought, famine, economic decline, poverty, and conscription.

According to Canadian census data of 1991, only 55 people of Cape Verdean birth were then living in Canada. This figure seems to be low since Cape Verdeans are known to reside in several major Canadian cities, including Toronto, Montreal, and Vancouver. In Toronto alone their number is estimated to be at least 300 (including those born in Canada), a number that is likely to increase in the incoming years.

Université de Montréal professor, Deirdre Meintel, estimates the number to be closer to 500. She attributes this to various factors including immigrants from Angola and Mozambique who are of Cape Verdean descent. Additionally, some Cape Verdeans may have identified as Portuguese or Black Canadians, making an accurate number difficult to obtain. Unofficial estimates by Cape Verdean community leaders and officials put the population at 4,000.  The population has become large enough to create a Caboverdeano Clube in Toronto and support Cape Verdean restaurants.  The immigrants typically come from the islands of Brava, Fogo, Maio, and Santiago.  Deirdre predicts that with time the Cape Verdean-Canadian population will continue to grow.

See also
Black Canadians
Portuguese Canadians
Cape Verdean Americans

References

Ethnic groups in Canada
African Canadian
History of immigration to Canada
Cape Verdean diaspora
Canada–Cape Verde relations